Sarah Robertson  (born 27 September 1993) is a Scottish field hockey player who plays as a midfielder or forward for Hampstead & Westminster and the Scotland and Great Britain national teams.

Club career
She plays club hockey in the Women's England Hockey League Premier Division for Hampstead & Westminster.

Robertson has also played club hockey for Edinburgh University Women's Hockey Club, KHC Dragons in Belgium and Holcombe.

International career
She made her senior international debut for Scotland in 2012 and in 2015 for Great Britain in 2015.

She represented Scotland at the 2014 Commonwealth Games and 2018 Commonwealth Games.

References

External links

1993 births
Living people
People educated at Selkirk High School
Alumni of the University of Edinburgh
Sportspeople from the Scottish Borders
Scottish female field hockey players
Field hockey players at the 2018 Commonwealth Games
Holcombe Hockey Club players
KHC Dragons players
Hampstead & Westminster Hockey Club players
Women's England Hockey League players
People from Melrose, Scottish Borders
Commonwealth Games competitors for Scotland
Field hockey players at the 2020 Summer Olympics
Olympic field hockey players of Great Britain
Olympic bronze medallists for Great Britain
Medalists at the 2020 Summer Olympics
Olympic medalists in field hockey
Scottish Olympic medallists
Field hockey players at the 2022 Commonwealth Games